Beinn an Lochain is a mountain in the Arrochar Alps, southern Scotland, on the western edge of Loch Lomond and the Trossachs National Park. Although included in Sir Hugh Munro's original list of Scottish mountains over 3000 feet, subsequent surveys showed it to be significantly shorter than the 914.4 m cut-off limit required to count as a Munro. Nonetheless, it remains a popular mountain, and is often quoted as an example of an interesting mountain below 3000 feet to show that there is more to mountaineering in Scotland than just Munro-bagging.

Beinn an Lochain is usually climbed from the car park at Butterbridge, on the A83 road, at the head of Glen Kinglas. From there, the summit is reached after a 2.5 km walk along the mountain's north-east ridge, climbing over 700 m.

References

Marilyns of Scotland
Corbetts
Mountains and hills of the Southern Highlands
Mountains and hills of Argyll and Bute
Sites of Special Scientific Interest in Mid Argyll and Cowal